Durham is a census-designated place (CDP) in Butte County, California, United States. The population was 5,518 at the 2010 census.

Geography
Durham's main agricultural products are almonds and walnuts.

Climate
According to the Köppen Climate Classification system, Durham has a warm-summer Mediterranean climate, abbreviated "Csa" on climate maps.

History

Durham was an experimental cooperative agricultural colony established under the 1917 California State and Settlement Act (AICP Exam Prep 3.0, 2014).

Durham was founded by the Durham Family. It is named for W. W. Durham, member of the California State Assembly. The Durham House still stands today as a reminder of what Durham was back in its early years. Durham was a town in which a railroad ran through and still does today. The railroad is what developed this town and kept it alive. The Durham Flour Mill, which burned down several times, was an integral part of this community.

On June 1, 2011, a tornado rated EF1, struck south of Durham, uprooting thousands of almond trees, destroying an out building and damaging a barn.

Demographics

2010
At the 2010 census Durham had a population of 5,518. The racial makeup of Durham was 5,088 (92.2%) White, 19 (0.3%) African American, 55 (1.0%) Native American, 35 (0.6%) Asian, 9 (0.2%) Pacific Islander, 165 (3.0%) from other races, and 147 (2.7%) from two or more races. Hispanic or Latino of any race were 614 people (11.1%).

The census reported that 5,509 people (99.8% of the population) lived in households, 9 (0.2%) lived in non-institutionalized group quarters, and no one was institutionalized.

There were 2,113 households, 713 (33.7%) had children under the age of 18 living in them, 1,286 (60.9%) were opposite-sex married couples living together, 181 (8.6%) had a female householder with no husband present, 103 (4.9%) had a male householder with no wife present.  There were 111 (5.3%) unmarried opposite-sex partnerships, and 15 (0.7%) same-sex married couples or partnerships. 413 households (19.5%) were one person and 188 (8.9%) had someone living alone who was 65 or older. The average household size was 2.61.  There were 1,570 families (74.3% of households); the average family size was 2.99.

The age distribution was 1,303 people (23.6%) under the age of 18, 428 people (7.8%) aged 18 to 24, 1,166 people (21.1%) aged 25 to 44, 1,828 people (33.1%) aged 45 to 64, and 793 people (14.4%) who were 65 or older.  The median age was 43.3 years. For every 100 females, there were 99.3 males.  For every 100 females age 18 and over, there were 97.8 males.

The homeowner vacancy rate was 1.4%; the rental vacancy rate was 3.5%.  4,089 people (74.1% of the population) lived in owner-occupied housing units and 1,420 people (25.7%) lived in rental housing units.

2000
At the 2000 census there were 5,220 people, 1,914 households, and 1,466 families residing in Durham. There were 1,986 housing units at an average density of 24.3 per square mile (9.4/km2). The racial makeup of the CDP was 92.18% White, 0.13% Black or African American, 0.79% Native American, 0.61% Asian, 0.11% Pacific Islander, 3.58% from other races, and 2.59% from two or more races.  8.98% of the population were Hispanic or Latino of any race.
Of the 1,914 households, 37.4% had children under the age of 18 living with them, 64.2% were married couples living together, 7.9% had a female householder with no husband present, and 23.4% were non-families. 18.8% of households were one person, and 7.6% were one person aged 65 or older.  The average household size was 2.72 and the average family size was 3.10.

In Durham, the population was spread out, with 28.1% under the age of 18, 7.0% from 18 to 24, 25.6% from 25 to 44, 26.4% from 45 to 64, and 13.0% 65 or older.  The median age was 39 years. For every 100 females, there were 99.8 males.  For every 100 females age 18 and over, there were 97.0 males.

The median household income was in Durham was $53,306, and the median family income was $61,373. Males had a median income of $42,568 versus $27,885 for females. The per capita income for the CDP was $26,361.  About 4.2% of families and 6.1% of the population were below the poverty line, including 5.7% of those under age 18 and 6.0% of those age 65 or over.

References

Census-designated places in Butte County, California
Census-designated places in California